Petra Pauliina Vaelma (born 11 May 1982) is a Finnish former football defender who most recently played for Klepp IL of the Norwegian Toppserien. She previously played for United Pietarsaari in the Naisten Liiga, and Bälinge IF and Umeå Södra in the Swedish Damallsvenskan, also playing in the UEFA Women's Champions League with United Pietarsaari.

Since 1998 she was a member of the Finnish national team, playing in the 2005 and 2009 editions of the European Championships.

Vaelma retired from football after the 2013 season, but remained in Stavanger to work in a hotel.

References

1982 births
Living people
Finnish women's footballers
Finland women's international footballers
Finnish expatriate footballers
Expatriate women's footballers in Norway
Expatriate women's footballers in Sweden
Eskilstuna United DFF players
Damallsvenskan players
Finnish expatriate sportspeople in Sweden
Finnish expatriate sportspeople in Norway
Toppserien players
FC United (Jakobstad) players
Kansallinen Liiga players
Bälinge IF players
Women's association football defenders
Footballers from Turku